Carol Bruyning, is a beauty queen who represented Aruba in Miss Divi-Divi International 2009 and won the maximum title.

Biography
Prior to her top 5 finish in the 2008 Miss Aruba Pageant, Carol completed her bachelor's degree in Business Economics at the University of Aruba and started work as an Accounting Coordinator. Carol later followed her heart and, at the first opportunity, became a High School Economics teacher.

Modeling knocked on Ms. Bruyning's door after the Miss Aruba 2008 Competition in the form of Aruba's number one modeling agency Koma Models. A few commercials, TV and magazine appearances also followed.

Her past experiences with both the Kiwanis Circle K of the University of Aruba and the Miss Aruba 2008 charity project (Famia Planea) inspired Carol to do even more.

After her presidency with the Kiwanis Circle K of the University of Aruba, Carol Bruyning founded the Fundacion Caranan Contento (Happy Faces Foundation).

The Foundation carries out a yearly event called Felis Pasco (Happy Christmas) where foundation members and students (most are Carol's current and ex students) bring the Christmas Experience to families who do not have the financial resources to do so themselves; a traditional Christmas dinner, gifts/baskets, local performers and Dj's is some of what goes on at the event.

Ms. Bruyning later represented Aruba in the Miss Ambar World 2009 (Miss Ambar Mundial) in the Dominican Republic. Of the 34 participants Bruyning made it into the top 15 finalists.

In October 2009 Carol Bruyning represented Aruba in the Miss Divi-Divi International 2009 pageant (Reinado Internacional del Divi-Divi) in Ríohacha, Colombia where Carol won becoming the first Miss Divi-Divi International.

References

External links
 Miss Ambar World 
 Miss Divi-Divi International
 Koma Models

1984 births
Living people
Aruban beauty pageant winners